Woodlands is a southern suburb of Durban, KwaZulu-Natal, South Africa. It lies just south of Montclair and borders Mobeni East.

References

Suburbs of Durban